Nikita Yazkov (born February 27, 1996) is a Russian professional ice hockey forward who is currently playing with HC Spartak Moscow in the Kontinental Hockey League (KHL). He is a one-time Russian Champion.

Awards and honours

References

External links

1996 births
Living people
Windsor Spitfires players
Metallurg Novokuznetsk players
Zauralie Kurgan players
Ak Bars Kazan players
Bars Kazan players
Metallurg Magnitogorsk players
Amur Khabarovsk players
Sokol Krasnoyarsk players
Chelmet Chelyabinsk players
People from Novokuznetsk
Sportspeople from Kemerovo Oblast